Radek Duda (born January 28, 1979 in Chodov) is a Czech former professional ice hockey player. He was selected by the Calgary Flames in the 7th round (192nd overall) of the 1998 NHL Entry Draft. played in the WHL with the Regina Pats

Duda played with HC Plzeň in the Czech Extraliga during the 2010–11 Czech Extraliga season.

Problems with a law 

Radek Duda was in 2012 conditionally sentenced to 3 months in prison for battering of a pedestrian on a crossing. For another two similar incidents Duda got a fine.

References

External links 

1979 births
Living people
Czech ice hockey right wingers
Calgary Flames draft picks
HK Dukla Trenčín players
People from Sokolov District
Sportspeople from the Karlovy Vary Region
People convicted of assault
Sportspeople convicted of crimes
Czech expatriate ice hockey players in Canada
Czech expatriate ice hockey players in Russia
Czech expatriate ice hockey players in Sweden
Czech expatriate ice hockey players in Finland
Czech expatriate ice hockey players in Switzerland
Czech expatriate ice hockey players in Germany
Czech expatriate sportspeople in Austria
Expatriate ice hockey players in Austria